Nahari is an Indo-Aryan language spoken in the states of Chhattisgarh and Odisha in India.

References

Eastern Indo-Aryan languages
Languages of India